"Da Da Da" is a 1982 song by the German band Trio.

Da Da Da may also refer to:
 Da Da Da (album), by Maki Ohguro (1983)
 "Da Da Da" (Lil Wayne song) (2009)
 "Da, Da, Da" (Prince song) (1996)
 Da! Da! Da!, or UFO Baby, a shōjo comedy manga by Mika Kawamura

See also
Dada (disambiguation)
Da da da dum, Beethoven's 5th Symphony
"De Do Do Do, De Da Da Da", song by The Police (1980)